Sasho Petrovski (Sašo Petrovski) (born 5 March 1975) is an Australian football (soccer) player who plays for South Coast Wolves. Petrovski has two caps for the Australian national team. Petrovski was known in the A-League as one of the most prolific strikers, scoring 41 goals between the 3 clubs.

Club career
In the old National Soccer League, Petrovski played 94 games and scored 47 goals. Petrovski scored the second hat trick in A-League history. He played for Viborg FF in the Danish Superliga.

Sydney FC
In 2005, he returned home to play in the newly formed A-League with Sydney FC, where he scored 20 goals in 50 appearances, becoming a fan favorite. On 5 January 2007, it was announced that Petrovski would be reunited with former Sydney FC manager Pierre Littbarski at Japanese second division club Avispa Fukuoka when the current A-League finishes.

Central Coast Mariners
However, this deal fell through, due to a limit of foreign players in the squad. He then signed with the Central Coast Mariners on 12 February 2007. Petrovski achieved his first milestone for the Gosford club, when he scored his 10th goal in the 3–2 loss to his former club Sydney FC in round 2 of the 2008–09 A-League season.

Newcastle Jets
On 3 February 2009 he signed a 2-year deal with rivals Newcastle Jets after he could not agree on terms for a new deal with the Mariners. Petrovski has enjoyed a successful start to his time at the Jets, scoring three goals in Newcastle's ACL campaign, topping their goal scorers list. He became a fan favorite with the Newcastle faithful, with whom he had been disliked, due to his time with Sydney FC and the Central Coast Mariners.

Since joining Newcastle, Petrovski has become just the 6th player to reach 100 A-League games. He marked his milestone with a late winner over a Robbie Fowler led North Queensland Fury, Petrovski muscled his way through the Fury defence to put his side up 3–2, with 7 minutes remaining in the match. In the 2010/11 season, Petrovski was the club's top scorer despite not starting a game all season. Petrovski left Newcastle after 2 seasons, after being unable to negotiate a new contract.

South Coast Wolves
It was reported that Petrovski would go on to sign with his former NSL club Wollongong Wolves, now known as South Coast Wolves in the NSW Premier League.

International career
He made his international debut against Japan in 2001 and scored his first international goal in the Asian Cup qualifier between Australia and Kuwait at Aussie Stadium on 16 August 2006.

Honours
With Central Coast Mariners:
 A-League Premiership: 2007–2008
With Sydney FC:
 A-League Championship: 2005–2006
 Oceania Club Championship: 2004–2005
With Wollongong Wolves:
 NSL Championship: 1999–2000, 2000–2001
 Oceania Club Championship: 2000–2001
Personal honours:
 NSL Top Scorer: 2000–2001 with Wollongong Wolves – 21 goals

References

External links
 Central Coast Mariners profile
 OzFootball profile

1975 births
Living people
Soccer players from Sydney
Newcastle Jets FC players
Australian people of Macedonian descent
Australia international soccer players
Wollongong Wolves FC players
FK Vardar players
FK Pelister players
Parramatta Power players
Viborg FF players
Sydney FC players
Central Coast Mariners FC players
A-League Men players
Danish Superliga players
National Soccer League (Australia) players
Parramatta FC players
Bankstown City FC players
National Premier Leagues players
Association football forwards
Australian soccer players